Calcium hypochlorite is an inorganic compound with formula Ca(OCl)2. It is a white solid, although commercial samples appear yellow.  It strongly smells of chlorine, owing to its slow decomposition in moist air.   This compound is relatively stable as a solid and solution and has greater available chlorine than sodium hypochlorite.  "Pure" samples have 99.2% active chlorine. Given common industrial purity, an active chlorine content of 65-70% is typical. It is the main active ingredient of commercial products called bleaching powder, used for water treatment and as a bleaching agent.

History
Charles Tennant and Charles Macintosh developed an industrial process for the manufacture of Chloride of Lime in the late 18th Century.  It was patented in 1799 and used heavily during World War I for disinfecting the trenches and wounds.

Uses

Sanitation
Calcium hypochlorite is commonly used to sanitize public swimming pools and disinfect drinking water. Generally the commercial substances are sold with a purity of 65% to 73% with other chemicals present, such as calcium chloride and calcium carbonate, resulting from the manufacturing process.  In solution, calcium hypochlorite could be used as a general purpose sanitizer, but due to calcium residue (making the water harder), sodium hypochlorite (bleach) is usually preferred.

Organic chemistry
Calcium hypochlorite is a general oxidizing agent and therefore finds some use in organic chemistry. For instance the compound is used to cleave glycols, α-hydroxy carboxylic acids and keto acids to yield fragmented aldehydes or carboxylic acids. Calcium hypochlorite can also be used in the haloform reaction to manufacture chloroform.
Calcium hypochlorite can be used to oxidize thiol and sulfide byproducts in organic synthesis and thereby reduce their odour and make them safe to dispose of. The reagent used in organic chemistry is similar to the sanitizer at ~70% purity.

Production
Calcium hypochlorite is produced industrially by treating moist slaked lime (Ca(OH)2) with chlorine. The one-step reaction is shown below:

Industrial setups allow for the reaction to be conducted in stages to give various compositions, each producing different ratios of rcalcium hypochlorite, unconverted lime, and calcium chloride. In one process, the chloride-rich first stage water is discarded, while the solid precipitate is dissolved in a mixture of water and lye for another round of chlorination to reach the target purity. Commercial calcium hypochlorite  consists of anhydrous Ca(OCl)2, dibasic calcium hypochlorite Ca3(OCl)2(OH)4 (also written as Ca(OCl)2·2Ca(OH)2), and dibasic calcium chloride Ca3Cl2(OH)4 (also written as CaCl2·2Ca(OH)2).

Reactions 
Calcium hypochlorite reacts rapidly with acids producing calcium chloride, chlorine gas, and water:

Safety
It is  a strong oxidizing agent, as it contains a hypochlorite ion at the valence +1 (redox state: Cl+1).

Calcium hypochlorite should not be stored wet and hot, or near any acid, organic materials, or metals. The unhydrated form is safer to handle.

See also 
Calcium hydroxychloride
 Sodium hypochlorite
 Winchlor

References

External links
 Chemical Land

Antiseptics
Bleaches
Hypochlorites
Calcium compounds
Oxidizing agents